The 2000 Cup of Russia was the fourth event of six in the 2000–01 ISU Grand Prix of Figure Skating, a senior-level international invitational competition series. It was held at the CKK Peterburgsky in Saint Petersburg on November 16–19. Medals were awarded in the disciplines of men's singles, ladies' singles, pair skating, and ice dancing. Skaters earned points toward qualifying for the 2000–01 Grand Prix Final. The compulsory dance was the Westminster Waltz.

Results

Men

Ladies

Pairs

Ice dancing

External links
 2000 Cup of Russia

Cup of Russia
Cup of Russia
Rostelecom Cup